Sisyrinchium elmeri is a species of flowering plant in the family Iridaceae known by the common name Elmer's blue-eyed grass. It is endemic to California, where it is known from many of the mountain ranges from the Klamath Mountains through the Sierra Nevada to the San Bernardino Mountains. It grows in moist habitat types such as meadows and bogs.

Description
Sisyrinchium elmeri is rhizomatous perennial herb takes a clumpy form, its narrow stems growing up to about 20 to 30 centimeters tall. It is medium green and nonwaxy, and it dries to a dark green or brownish color, but does not turn black. The flat, narrow leaves are grasslike. The flower has six tepals measuring roughly a centimeter long. They are yellow to yellow-orange with dark brown veining. The fruit is a dark brown capsule.

References

External links
Jepson Manual Treatment — Sisyrinchium elmeri
USDA Plants Profile: Sisyrinchium elmeri
Flora of North America
Sisyrinchium elmeri — U.C. Photo gallery

elmeri
Endemic flora of California
Flora of the Klamath Mountains
Flora of the Sierra Nevada (United States)
Natural history of the Transverse Ranges
~
Flora without expected TNC conservation status